Alan Emtage (born November 27, 1964) is a Bajan-Canadian computer scientist who conceived and implemented the first version of Archie, a pre-Web Internet search engine for locating material in public FTP archives. It is widely considered the world's first Internet search engine.

Life
Emtage was born in Barbados, the son of Sir Stephen and Lady Emtage. He attended high school at Harrison College from 1975 to 1983 (and in 1981 became the owner of a Sinclair ZX81 with 1K of memory), where he graduated at the top of his class, winning the Barbados Scholarship.

In 1983 Emtage entered McGill University in Montreal, Quebec, Canada, studying for an honors Bachelor's degree in computer science which was followed by a Master's degree in 1987 from which he graduated in 1991. Emtage was part of the team that brought the first Internet link to eastern Canada (and only the second link in the country) in 1986. In 1989 while a student and working as a systems administrator for the School of Computer Science, Emtage conceived and implemented the original version of the Archie search engine, the world's first Internet search engine.

In 1992, Emtage along with Peter Deutsch, also a McGill graduate, formed Bunyip Information Systems in Montreal—the world's first company expressly founded for and dedicated to providing Internet information services with a licensed commercial version of the Archie search engine.

Emtage was a founding member of the Internet Society and went on to create and chair several working groups at the Internet Engineering Task Force (IETF), the standard-setting body for the Internet. Working with other pioneers such as Tim Berners-Lee, Marc Andreessen, Mark McCahill (creator of Gopher) and Jon Postel, Emtage co-chaired the Uniform Resource Identifier working group which created the standard for Uniform Resource Locators (URLs).

On September 18, 2017 Emtage was inducted as an Innovator by the Internet Society into the Internet Hall of Fame in a ceremony in Los Angeles.

On October 20, 2019 Emtage was conferred the Honorary Degree of Doctor of Science from the University of the West Indies.

On October 26, 2022 Emtage was conferred the Honorary Degree of Doctor of Science from McGill University.

Emtage has spoken and lectured on Internet Information Systems and is chief technical officer at Mediapolis, a Web engineering company in New York City.

Works 
 A. Emtage, P. Deutsch, archie - An Electronic Directory Service for the Internet Winter Usenix Conference Proceedings 1992.  Pages 93–110.
 Michael F. Schwartz, Alan Emtage, Brewster Kahle, B. Clifford Neuman, A Comparison of Internet Resource Discovery Approaches, Computing Systems, Fall 1992, pp. 461–493, 5(4),
 P. Deutsch, A. Emtage, A. Marine, How to Use Anonymous FTP (RFC1635, May 1994)
 Alan Emtage, "Publishing in the Internet environment", Proceedings of the Sixth Joint European Networking Conference, 1995
 Alan Emtage, "Can You Imagine A World Without Search?", Medium, September 2015

References 

Additional sources
 The Search: How Google and Its Rivals Rewrote the Rules of Business and Transformed Our Culture John Battelle (Portfolio Hardcover, 2005) 
 How the Web was Born: The Story of the World Wide Web Robert Cailliau, James Gillies, R. Cailliau (Oxford University Press, 2000) 
The Information Revolution: The Not-for-Dummies Guide to the History, Technology, And Use of the World Wide Web J. R. Okin (Ironbound Press, 2005) 
Encyclopedia of Library and Information Science Marcel Dekker (CRC Press, 2002) 
Encyclopedia of Microcomputers Allen Kent, James G Williams, Kent Kent (Marcel Dekke, 2002) 
 Hobbes' Internet Timeline
 A Brief History of Search Engines
 PC Magazine, April 24, 2007

External links 
 Home page for Alan Emtage
 Radio Interview - starts at 36:08 (November 7, 2009) - Saturday Live, BBC Radio 4

McGill University Faculty of Science alumni
1964 births
Living people
Barbadian emigrants to Canada
Barbadian emigrants to the United States
Canadian computer scientists
Internet pioneers